Shafiga Hashim gizi Mammadova (March 30, 1945) — is an Azerbaijani cinema and theatre actress. She was the honoured Artist of the Azerbaijan SSR (1974) and People's Artist of the Azerbaijan SSR (1982).

Biography
She was born on March 30, 1945, in Derbent, Dagestan, Russia.

In 1968, Shafiga graduated from actor faculty of Azerbaijan State Theatrical Institute. Since 1968, she played at Azerbaijan State Academic Drama Theatre. Since 1980, she teaches at Azerbaijan State University of Culture and Arts (former Theatrical Institute). From 1995 to 2000, she was deputy of the National Assembly of Azerbaijan. She has a professor's degree.

Awards
June 1, 1974 – Honoured Artiste of the Azerbaijan SSR.
1980 – the State Prize of the Azerbaijan SSR for Farida's role in “Birthday film.
1981 – the USSR State Prize for Gulya’s role in “Interrogation film.
December 1, 1982 – People’s Artist of the Azerbaijan SSR.

Activity in the theatre
Shafiga Mammadova created unforgettable characters in the theatre.

Hamlet – Gertrude
Gathering of mad people of Jalil Mammadguluzadeh – Pirpiz Sona
Disappointed girl – Sona
Summer days of the city – Dilare
The Living Corpse of Leo Tolstoy – Masha
Native land of Chinghiz Aitmatov – Jenshengul’s wife
Intrigue and Love – Lady Milford
Gold of Eugene O'Neilll – Susanne
Khayyam of Huseyn Javid – Sevda
Voice coming from gardens of Ilyas Efendiyev – Guljan
My sin – Nurjahan
Destroyed diaries – Anjel
After the rain of Bakhtiyar Vahabzadeh – Nihal
When the fairytale begins of Imran Gasimov – Tahira
Comedy of mankind or Don Juan – Theodora
Parvenues – Yelena Nikolayevna
Human of Samad Vurgun – Natasha
Jealous hearts  of Racho Stoyanov – Milkana
Aydin of Jafar Jabbarly – Gultekin
Bald mountain of Akram Aylisli

Filmography
Swarthy (1966) – Perijahan
Our Jabish muellim (1969) – Jabish’s wife
Through the path of charvadars (1974) – Sariya
Dada Gorgud (1975) – Burla Khatun
Value of happiness (1976) – Rukhsara
Birthday (1977) – Farida
To volcano (1977)
Interrogation (1979) – Gulya
Film director Hasan Seyidbeyli (2002) (documentary)

References

1945 births
Azerbaijani people of Dagestani descent
People from Derbent
Recipients of the USSR State Prize
People's Artists of Azerbaijan
Soviet Azerbaijani people
Members of the National Assembly (Azerbaijan)
Women members of the National Assembly (Azerbaijan)
Living people